Adia cinerella is a species of fly in the genus Adia. They are distributed from Yukon Territory to Greenland, Mexico, Georgia, the Bermuda islands and Europe.

References

Anthomyiidae
Insects described in 1825
Brachyceran flies of Europe
Taxa named by Carl Fredrik Fallén